Lakevale  (Scottish Gaelic: Gleann a’ Loch) is a community in the Canadian province of Nova Scotia, located in Antigonish County.

References

Further reading

Communities in Antigonish County, Nova Scotia